Thomas Woods (1923 – 17 April 1961) was an Irish writer and diplomat.

Woods was born in Galway. He was a writer, and Ireland's Permanent Representative to the Council of Europe. He died in Strasbourg. He wrote a column for the books section of The Irish Times under the pseudonym "Thersites" and for other publications as "Thomas Hogan".

Select bibliography

 Poetry and philosophy. A study in the thought of John Stuart Mill, London, 1961
 Intermediate Certificate French Poetry, editor, 1946 and 1948
 Leaving Certificate French Poetry, editor, 1946

References

1961 deaths
Irish writers
1923 births
Irish expatriates in France